Euchrysops nilotica, the desert blue or milky bean Cupid, is a butterfly in the family Lycaenidae. It is found in Senegal, the Gambia, Burkina Faso, northern Nigeria, Niger, northern Cameroon, southern Sudan, Uganda, Ethiopia, Somalia and northern Kenya. The habitat consists of arid Sudanian Savanna and the Sahel.

References

Butterflies described in 1904
Euchrysops